Merritt Graybiel Putman (22 February 1900 – 1995) was a Canadian cross-country skier. He competed in the men's 18 kilometre event at the 1928 Winter Olympics.

References

1900 births
1995 deaths
Canadian male cross-country skiers
Canadian male Nordic combined skiers
Olympic cross-country skiers of Canada
Olympic Nordic combined skiers of Canada
Cross-country skiers at the 1928 Winter Olympics
Nordic combined skiers at the 1928 Winter Olympics
Skiers from Ottawa